Samuel Burleigh Gabriel (1816 – 26 June 1865) was a Victorian architect who practised in Bristol, England. For a number of years he was in partnership with another architect, John Hicks, who later worked at Dorchester.  Their offices were at 28 Corn Street, Bristol.

Gabriel designed parish churches for the Church of England and houses for private clients.

One of Gabriel's last commissions was Ashley House in Bristol for Sir Charles Wathen. Wathen served as Mayor of Bristol and contributed to the building of several of its public buildings. In 2008 there was a proposal to demolish Ashley House and SAVE Britain's Heritage responded by supporting a campaign for the building's retention.

Works
St. Mark's parish church, Easton, Bristol, 1843–48
St. Simon the Apostle parish church, Baptist Mills, Bristol, 1845–48
St. Jude the Apostle with St. Matthias-on-the-Weir parish church, Old Market, Bristol, 1845–49
St. Michael the Archangel parish church, Two-Mile-Hill, Bristol, 1846–49
St. Anne's parish church, Bowden Hill, Wiltshire, 1856
St. Mary's parish church, West Kington, Wiltshire, 1856
Chew Stoke School, Chew Stoke, Somerset, 1858
St. Michael the Archangel parish church, Compton Martin, Somerset: restoration, 1858–59
St. John the Evangelist parish church, Clifton, Bristol, 1858–69
St. Paul's parish, Southville, Bristol: vicarage, 1860
St. Stephen's parish church, Beechingstoke, Wiltshire: restoration, 1860–61
St. Michael the Archangel parish church, Dundry, Somerset: rebuilding, 1860–62
Parish church, Manningford Abbots, Wiltshire: rebuilding, 1861–64
St. James' parish church, Cherhill, Wiltshire: restoration, 1863
Ashley House, Ashley, Bristol, 1865–66

References

Sources and further reading

1816 births
Date of birth missing
1865 deaths
19th-century English architects
Architects from Bristol
Gothic Revival architects
English ecclesiastical architects